Rakshassu is a 1984 Indian Malayalam horror film, directed by Hassan and produced by Areefa Hassan. The film stars Baby, Sukumaran, Baby Ajitha and Bheeman Raghu in the lead roles. The film has musical score by A. T. Ummer.

Cast

Sukumaran as Sukumaran
Ratheesh as Ratheesh
Bheeman Raghu as Raghu
Baby Anju as Shalini
Baby Ajitha
Sankaradi as Sankaran
Sathaar as Ravi
Kuthiravattam Pappu as Mammad
Seema as Seema
Gomathi as Gomathi

Soundtrack
The music was composed by A. T. Ummer and the lyrics were written by Vasudevan Panampilly, Ramachandran Ponnani and K. G. Menon.

References

External links
 

1984 films
1980s Malayalam-language films